Gonoretodes is a monotypic moth genus belonging to the subfamily Drepaninae from Madagascar. It was first described by Watson in 1965.

Species

There is only one species in this genus: Gonoretodes timea  Watson, 1965 from Moramanga in eastern Madagascar.

References 

Watson 1965. "A revision of the Ethiopian Drepanidae (Lepidoptera)". Bulletin of the British Museum of natural History (Entomology) Supplement 3:1–178, pls. 1–18.

Drepaninae
Moths of Madagascar
Moths of Africa
Monotypic moth genera
Drepanidae genera